Apocleora rimosa is a moth of the family Geometridae first described by Arthur Gardiner Butler in 1879. It is found in Japan.

The wingspan is 33–35 mm.

External links
Japanese Moths

Ennominae
Moths of Japan
Moths described in 1879